Andrés Gómez (born 27 November 1983 in Caracas, Venezuela), is a Venezuelan actor, model and singer.

Filmography

References 

Venezuelan male models
21st-century Venezuelan male actors
Male actors from Caracas
Venezuelan male telenovela actors
Living people
1993 births
21st-century Venezuelan  male singers
Singers from Caracas